"Waitin' for a Superman" (subtitled "Is It Gettin' Heavy??" for the song's U.S. album release) is a song by The Flaming Lips, released as the second single taken from their 1999 album The Soft Bulletin, and reaching No. 73 in the UK Singles Chart.

Single release
The b-sides of the UK release complete the 4-CD set for "Thirty-Five Thousand Feet of Despair" and "Riding to Work in the Year 2025." The first two CD parts for these songs can be found on the two UK "Race for the Prize" singles.

The U.S. release features material from the UK release of "Race for the Prize."

The song was also released by UK band Fightstar.

David Bazan has been known to cover this song live.

Coldplay covered the song live at a show in Oklahoma, the home state of the Flaming Lips, on the Viva la Vida Tour in 2008.

Iron & Wine included an acoustic cover of the song on the album "Around the Well" in 2009.

Scott Weiland covered the song on the album "A Compilation of Scott Weiland Cover Songs" in 2011.

Track listing
US CD
 "Waitin' for a Superman (Is It Gettin' Heavy??)" (Radio edit)
 "Waitin' for a Superman" (Album version)
 "Waitin' for a Superman" (Mokran remix)
 "Thirty-Five Thousand Feet of Despair" (Stereo remix)
 "Riding to Work in the Year 2025 (Your Invisible Now) (Stereo remix)
 QuickTime-accessible music videos for "Waitin' for a Superman", "Race for the Prize", and "Be My Head".

UK CD1
 "Waitin' for a Superman" (Radio edit)
 "Riding to Work in the Year 2025 (Your Invisible Now)" (From Zaireeka CD No.3)
 "Thirty-Five Thousand Feet of Despair" (From Zaireeka CD No.3)

UK CD2
 "Waitin' for a Superman" (Radio edit)
 "Riding to Work in the Year 2025 (Your Invisible Now)" (From Zaireeka CD No.4)
 "Thirty-Five Thousand Feet of Despair" (From Zaireeka CD No.4)

Chart performance

References

1999 singles
The Flaming Lips songs
1999 songs
Warner Records singles
Songs written by Michael Ivins
Songs written by Steven Drozd
Songs written by Wayne Coyne